KWUB was a WB affiliate on cable channel 6 in the Yuma, Arizona – El Centro, California market. Being a cable-only station, the call letters used were neither assigned nor sanctioned by the Federal Communications Commission (FCC). KWUB was carried on the Adelphia cable systems (later Time Warner Cable in this market). KECY-TV managed and provided local support for KWUB. Before KWUB signed on, Yuma, AZ and El Centro, CA viewers received the WB programs via Superstation WGN or via KTLA or San Diego affiliate KSWB-TV (now a Fox affiliate).

KWUB was part of The WB 100+ Station Group. In September 2006, UPN and the WB became The CW Television Network and KWUB ceased operation, with The CW picked up by KSWT as a digital subchannel, which occupied cable 6 on Time Warner's systems. The CW would later return to KECY as a subchannel.

References

Defunct local cable stations in the United States
Television channels and stations established in 1998
Television channels and stations disestablished in 2006
1998 establishments in Arizona
2006 disestablishments in Arizona
WUB
WUB